Michaël Llodra and Fabrice Santoro were the defending champions, but Santoro did not participate this year.  Llodra partnered Thierry Ascione, losing in the first round.

Julien Benneteau and Arnaud Clément won in the final 6–2, 6–7(3–7), [10–7], against František Čermák and Jaroslav Levinský.

Seeds

Draw

Draw

External links
Main Draw

Doubles
2006 ATP Tour